Richer Sounds is a British home entertainment retailer that operates through a chain of 51 stores and online, mainly in England. The business was 100% owned by Julian Richer, the founder and managing director of the company, who in 2019 sold 60% of its shares to an employee ownership trust.

History of the business

Richer Sounds formally began trading in 1978 when Richer, then aged 19, opened his first shop near London Bridge, with the help of photography retailer Vic Odden. This shop established the record for highest sales per square foot of any retail outlet in the world in 1994, a record still current in 2023 according to the Guinness Book of Records.

In November 2013 Julian Richer announced to the press that, upon his death, he would bequeath 100% of the firm to a trust co-owned by employees of the company. In May 2019 Richer, then aged 60, announced that he had transferred ownership to employees by passing 60% of his shares to a trust, as well as separately paying each of his over 500 employees, excluding directors, from his own pocket a thank you bonus of £1,000 for every year of work, a total of about £4 million, as the employees had worked for an average of 8 years each.

Awards and recognition 
In January 2011, Richer Sounds received a Royal Warrant.

Richer Sounds won several Which? 'Retailer of the Year' or 'Best Retailer' awards, including for 2010, 2011, 2015, 2018  2019, 2021, and 2022.

Richer Sounds is an accredited holder of the Fair Tax Mark for transparency over tax disclosures and the amount they pay, and a part of the Living Wage Scheme, set up by the Living Wage Foundation. Founder Julian Richer backed their Living Hours program, which seeks to curb zero-hour contracts.

References

External links
Official website
The Independent: Julian Richer talks about employee suggestion schemes
CustomerServiceWorld.com: Julian Richer talks about employee suggestion schemes
Managementtoday.com: Ninety-five per cent of this man's staff say they love working for him. What's his secret?
TopMBA.com: Increasing human and social capital by applying job embeddedness theory
The Guardian: Richer Sounds' charitable donations
BBC reports on Richer Sounds being named as winner of the Which? High Street Shop Survey, 2011

Consumer electronics retailers of the United Kingdom
Employee-owned companies of the United Kingdom
Retail companies established in 1978
1978 establishments in the United Kingdom